Ramarajulanka is a village located in East Godavari district in Andhra Pradesh, India.

A Ramalayam is in the center of the village, as well as a goddess Muthyalamma. In nearby  Chinchinada there is a very well constructed bridge connecting West & East Godavari districts. The Ramarajulanka pin code is 533253.

There is a temple on each road in Ramarajulanka, and the village has many coconut trees and paddy fields. Lord Subrahmanyeshwara temple is a famous attraction in the region. There are many tourist attractions around the village, including the famous SHIVALAYAM (parvathi rama lingeshwara swamy temple). An 18ft. Hanuman idol is located in a farming area, which is one of the main attractions of the village.

Population Data

Villages in East Godavari district